General Guido Partido is a partido in the eastern part of Buenos Aires Province in Argentina.

Settlements
General Guido
Labardén
La Posta
La Unión

References

External links

 

Partidos of Buenos Aires Province
States and territories established in 1839